Little (Chamber) Symphony No.4: (Dixtour pour instruments à cordes), Op.74, by Darius Milhaud is a work for 10 string instruments composed in Vienna in 1921.  It is not to be confused with Symphony No.4.  The music is polytonal and progresses through a variety of contrasting moods.  The first two movements employ ostinatos to repeat basic musical ideas.  The first movement is marked “Animé”.  It is a lively dance in triple meter and stylistically refers back to the baroque period.  The second movement is marked “Assez lent” and features multiple double bass solos.  The final movement incorporates imitative polyphony in a fugal section.

Milhaud’s fourth little symphony is approximately 6 minutes in duration and contains the following movements:

 Ouverture (approx. 0’45’’)
 Choral (approx. 3’25’’)
 Etude (approx. 1’50’’)

This little symphony was originally published by Dover Publications in 1922.

Instrumentation
 4 Violins
 2 Violas
 2 Cellos
 2 Double Basses

Reception
Little Symphony No.4 has received mixed reviews since its inception.  G. W. Hopkins pointed out the “irritating antics” of this little symphony in his 1970 review in The Musical Times.  Christopher Headington of the classical music review website Gramophone referred to the etude movement as “comic.”

Recordings
 A 1975 recording on vinyl on the ABC Westminster Gold label, featuring The Chamber Orchestra of The Leningrad Philharmonic conducted by Gennady Rozhdestvenski
 A 1994 CD recording on the Koch Schwann label, featuring Capella Cracoviensis and Karl Anton Rickenbacher
 A 1969 recording on vinyl on the Candide label, featuring the Orchestra of Radio Luxemburg

References

External links
 Video - New Violin Family Orchestra performs - Darius Milhaud - Chamber Symphony No. 4 (1 of 3) (2:14) https://www.youtube.com/watch?v=hUeSD1Wp3y8
 Video - New Violin Family Orchestra performs - Darius Milhaud - Chamber Symphony No. 4 (2 of 3) (2:58) https://www.youtube.com/watch?v=MuqnLwvJ-GM
 Video - New Violin Family Orchestra performs - Darius Milhaud - Chamber Symphony No. 4 (3 of 3) (3:25) https://www.youtube.com/watch?v=cussANFHukI

Compositions for decet
Symphonies by Darius Milhaud